Kaiki Bruno da Silva (born 8 March 2003), known as Kaiki, is a Brazilian footballer who plays as a left-back for Cruzeiro.

Club career
Born in Belo Horizonte, Kaiki started playing football at a football school in Betim at the age of seven. At the age of ten, he featured in a local tournament for Instituto Mineiro de Escolas de Futebol (IMEF), scoring 15 goals and catching the attention of Cruzeiro, who he would go on to join a year later. At the same time, he was playing futsal for Olímpico in Belo Horizonte.

International career
Kaiki Bruno has represented Brazil at under-20 level.

Career statistics

Club

Notes

References

2003 births
Living people
Footballers from Belo Horizonte
Brazilian footballers
Brazil youth international footballers
Association football defenders
Campeonato Brasileiro Série B players
Cruzeiro Esporte Clube players